Flight 293 may refer to:
Northwest Orient Airlines Flight 293, crashed on 3 June 1963
American Airlines Flight 293, hijacked on 20 June 1979
Miami Air Flight 293, crashed on 3 May 2019

0293